The Australia  women's cricket team played the India women's cricket team in March 2018. The tour consisted of three Women's One Day Internationals (WODIs) which formed part of the 2017–20 ICC Women's Championship. Following the WODI matches, both teams played in a tri-series, with England  women being the third team. Australia Women won the series 3–0 and became the number one ranked side in WODIs.

Squads

Tour matches

1st 50-over match: India A Women v Australia Women

2nd 50-over match: India A Women v Australia Women

WODI series

1st WODI

2nd WODI

3rd WODI

Notes

References

External links
 Series home at ESPN Cricinfo

International cricket competitions in 2017–18
2017–20 ICC Women's Championship
2018 in women's cricket
2017–18 Indian women's cricket
2017–18 Australian women's cricket season
India 2018
Australia 2018